Serrata stylaster is a species of sea snail, a marine gastropod mollusk in the family Marginellidae, the margin snails.

Description
The shell grows to a length of 4.7 mm

Distribution
This species occurs in the Pacific Ocean off New Caledonia

References

 Boyer F. (2001). Espèces nouvelles de Marginellidae du niveau bathyal de la Nouvelle-Calédonie. Novapex 2(4): 157–169
 Boyer F. (2008) The genus Serrata Jousseaume, 1875 (Caenogastropoda: Marginellidae) in New Caledonia. In: V. Héros, R.H. Cowie & P. Bouchet (eds), Tropical Deep-Sea Benthos 25. Mémoires du Muséum National d'Histoire Naturelle 196: 389–436. page(s): 421

Marginellidae
Gastropods described in 2001